Mawson Lakes  is a residential suburb in the City of Salisbury, Adelaide, Australia. Named in honor of Sir Douglas Mawson, it has a census area population of 10,872 people. The suburb is located in the northern suburbs of Adelaide around 12 km north of the Central business district. Much of the suburb was previously known as The Levels, and was a non-residential area, housing a campus of the University of South Australia and Technology Park Adelaide.

History

Technology Park Adelaide

Technology Park Adelaide is Australia's first technology park, having been established in 1982 by the Government of South Australia.  It is currently owned and managed by the Government of South Australia's Land Management Corporation.

The Technology Park Adelaide is a  site which allows any organisation with a technological focus to locate there.  Over 90 organisations are located at the Park, with the majority of these organisations having a defence focus.  The main types of organisations at the Park are classified as Small to Medium Enterprises (SME)  however large corporate organisations have a presence in the Park, including Daronmont Technologies, Lockheed Martin, BAE Systems, Saab Systems, Topcon, Optus, Xtralis, Codan and Raytheon.

The Park is located adjacent to the Mawson Lakes project, which is a joint venture between the Land Management Corporation and Delfin Lend Lease.

Demographics 

According to the 2016 Census, the population of the Mawson Lakes census area was 13,297 people. Approximately 50.4% of the population were male, with 49.6% identifying as female. 55.5% are Australian born, over 83.1% of residents are Australian citizens and only 0.7% were native born indigenous people. Mawson Lakes has a fully educated population of around 30.6%, with that amount of people holding a(n) (Advanced)Diploma or Year 12 diploma. 18.3% of the population identify themselves as Catholic, while an almost doubled 33.0% identify with no religion at all.

Transport

Mawson Lakes is connected to the major Adelaide thoroughfares of Main North Road, Salisbury Highway and Port Wakefield Road. Adelaide's city centre can typically be reached by car in 30 minutes.

Although there are good connections to Adelaide's public transport network, only 3.9% take the bus to work, while a smaller 3.6% of people use the train. Bus routes connect Mawson Lakes to the Central business district as well as Salisbury, Elizabeth and Modbury. Mawson Interchange, built in 2005, is located on the Gawler railway line. Services are high frequency, with 15-minute services to the City and Gawler.

Parafield Airport, Adelaide's main civil airport from 1927 to 1955, lies just to the north of Mawson Lakes and is currently used for small aircraft, pilot training and recreational aviation.

Water supply 

Mawson Lakes features a dual water supply system, supplying drinking water and recycled water to homes via completely separate mains.  When first installed the facilities at Mawson Lakes were the largest self-contained water recycling scheme in Australia. Purple pipes and fittings are used to distinguish recycled water sources. The recycling scheme results in Mawson Lakes using 50% less potable water than comparable suburbs and means that resident using recycled water are exempt from state water restrictions

The recycled water is sourced from the Bolivar Sewage Treatment plant approximately 8 km away and then has stormwater added to it from the Salisbury wetlands before it is treated to Class A standard recycled water for use on gardens, reserves and connected to the toilet of each residence in Mawson Lakes. SA Water provides a comprehensive audit of homes within the area to ensure that cross connection between the recycled water and drinking water does not occur.

Mawson Central

The central commercial area of Mawson Lakes, situated between Main Street and Garden Terrace, and north of the Promenade is the central shopping precinct with a Hotel, Woolworths, ALDI, and a number of smaller shops and restaurants. Main Street and its side roads are also home to Bank branches, various professional services, and a number of offices. In recent years, many offices have been converted into apartments due to the proximity of the university and a glut of office space.

Politics

Mawson Lakes is a part of the federal division of Makin, which has been represented by Labor MP Tony Zappia since 2007, and was a part of the state electoral district of Port Adelaide, which has been represented by State Labor MP and Minister for Education and Child Development and Minister for Higher Education and Skills Susan Close since 2012.

Results shown here are from the most recent federal and state elections. Mawson Lakes was part of the state electoral district of Port Adelaide, which is said to be a 'working class' seat and therefore safe-Labor. It was shifted by the Electoral Districts Boundaries Commission into neighbouring electoral district of Playford for the upcoming 2018 state election, which is also a safe Labor seat.

Sport 
Mawson Lakes is home to the Mawson Lakes Football Club, the only football club in the area, the Palms Golf Club, and the Mawson Lakes Cricket Club who have played in the area since 1955. As well as being home to the Mawson Lakes Model Yacht Club, the Club is the largest model yacht club in Australia. Mawson Lakes Rowing Club, at the boat shed located off First avenue, with a 450 m course on the main lake.

See also
 List of Adelaide suburbs

References

External links 

 mawsonlakes.com.au - Delfin's Mawson Lakes Community Website
 community.mawsonlakes.org - MawsonLakes.Org Community Website (non-commercial)

Suburbs of Adelaide